Chrysoteuchia topiarius, the topiary grass-veneer moth, subterranean sod webworm or cranberry girdler, is a moth of the family Crambidae. The species was first described by Philipp Christoph Zeller in 1866. It is found in most of North America.

The wingspan is 17–20 mm. The forewings vary from dark clay coloured to light yellowish brown. The hindwings are grey. Adults are on wing from late June to early August in one generation per year.

The larvae feed on a wide range of plant, including mostly grasses. The young larvae feed on soft tissue such as the crowns, leaves and roots of their host plant. Mature larvae feed on the bark of cranberry and conifer seedling roots and crowns. They have also been recorded on blueberry.

Gallery

References

Moths described in 1866
Crambini
Moths of North America